The Antigorio Valley is one of the Alpine valleys radiating from the Ossola Valley (Province of Verbano Cusio Ossola), in the region of Piedmont, northern Italy.

Geography
The River Toce flows across the Antigorio Valley. The valley begins to the south, near Domodossola. It rises to the north, includes the towns of Crevoladossola, Crodo, Baceno and Premia, and it ends in the hamlet of Premia Chioso. As the valley continues to the north it is called Val Formazza. From the town of Baceno it opens to the north-west of the Valley Devero, from which Alpe Devero is reachable..

Valleys of the Alps
Valleys of Piedmont
Geological type localities